Desmostylus is an extinct genus of herbivorous mammal of the family Desmostylidae living from the Chattian stage of the Late Oligocene subepoch through the Late Miocene subepoch (28.4 mya—7.250 Mya) and in existence for approximately .

Description

It had a short tail and powerful legs with four hooves. Both the creature's jaws were elongated and sported forward-facing tusks, which were elongated canines and incisors.

Most likely fully aquatic, Desmostylus is thought to have lived in shallow water in coastal regions, usually less than 30 meters deep. Recent isotope work indicates that Desmostylus more likely lived (or spent a large amount of time) in freshwater or estuary ecosystems foraging for aquatic freshwater plants.

Its less dense bone structure suggests that Desmostylus had a lifestyle of active swimming and possibly feeding at the surface, unlike other desmostylians that were primarily slow swimmers and/or bottom walkers and sea grass feeders.

Species
Desmostylus hesperus (synonyms and invalid names: D. watasei, D. cymatias, D. californicus, D. mirabilis, D. minor, Desmostylella typica), D. coalingensis (syn. Vanderhoofius coalingensis), and D. japonicus.

 named the type specimen D. hesperus based on a set of isolated teeth that he had found near Mission San Jose, California (type locality: , paleocoordinates ).  Marsh described his specimen as a sirenian and proposed affinities with Metaxytherium (a genus of extinct dugongs) and Halicore (an obsolete name for dugong).

Several other species were later described based on minor differences in tooth morphology. Most or all of these species have been synonymized with D. hesperus since variation in tooth morphology between individuals assigned to one of these species has proven to be to greater than the differences between species.

It has been reproposed as distinct species based on cranial morphology.

Fossil distribution
Fossils have been discovered from along the northern Pacific Rim from Baja California Peninsula northward along the coast of California, Oregon, Washington and west to Sakhalin Island, Hokkaido, Japan, and south to the Shimane Prefecture, Japan.

Notes

References

 
 
 

 
 
 
 
 
 

Desmostylians
Miocene mammals
Tortonian genus extinctions
Extinct animals of Japan
Extinct animals of North America
Prehistoric placental genera
Fossil taxa described in 1888
Taxa named by Othniel Charles Marsh
Chattian genus first appearances
Fossils of Japan
Fossils of the United States
Fossils of Mexico
Fossils of Russia